Jefferson High School is a high school located in the lower Shenandoah Valley in Shenandoah Junction, West Virginia. It was established in the fall of 1972, when the county combined Charles Town, Harpers Ferry, and Shepherdstown High Schools. It remained the only high school in Jefferson County until the fall of 2008. In-county rival, Washington High School, opened for the 2008–09 school year, splitting the Jefferson student body. Jefferson's total enrollment is 1,400.

Jefferson's baseball program is the most decorated in West Virginia. The Cougars have won 12 state championships, most recently winning back-to-back titles in 2015-16. John Lowery has headed the program since the school's opening. He owns more than 1,330 wins and has led the Cougars to 45 straight 20+ win seasons. 

Jefferson's softball team won its first state title in 2022. The Cougars' boys track team has won six state championships, including four straight from 2010-2013. Girls track (2009 and 2021), boys tennis (1992), cross country (2011) and girls soccer (2007) have also won state championships.

Notable graduates include former NFL wide receiver James Jett and former NFL safety Dewey McDonald and MLB first-round draft pick Josh Cenate. 

The Jefferson "Cougar" Marching Band, under the direction of Mr. J.P. Lynch Jr., is recognized as one of the top bands in West Virginia. The band has over 175 student musicians, and in 2012 the band was awarded first place in the Tournament of Bands (TOB) championships.  A notable achievement includes the honor of marching in the Cherry Blossom Festival in Washington D.C. in April of 2013, 2015, and 2022. The Jefferson High School Symphonic Band was also named The West Virginia Honor Band in 2011, 2013, 2015, 2017, 2019, and 2022.

See also
Jefferson County Schools
List of high schools in West Virginia
Education in West Virginia

References

External links

Jefferson High School

Jefferson
Schools in Jefferson County, West Virginia
Educational institutions established in 1972
1972 establishments in West Virginia